Ha Nkoebe is a community council located in the Quthing District of Lesotho. Its population in 2006 was 10,487.

Villages
The community of Ha Nkoebe includes the villages of Bolahla (Ha Makama), Bolahla (Ha Mphallo), Bolahla (Ha Sejakhosi), Bolahla (Kepeng), Bolahla (Livovong), Bolahla (Masuoaneng), Bolahla (Seteketeng), Buya-Vuthe, Ha Boke, Ha Boloumane, Ha Hlalele, Ha Kabi, Ha Kaloli (Fokomo), Ha Kaloli (Lebangong), Ha Kaloli (Likolobeng), Ha Kaloli (Location), Ha Kotane, Ha Lebona, Ha Machotoane, Ha Malephane, Ha Masunyane, Ha Moseneke, Ha Moseneke (Kanana), Ha Mosifa, Ha Motsapi, Ha Mphakela, Ha Mphasane, Ha Nyolo, Ha Piti (Likhohlong), Ha Potomane, Ha Qhotsi, Ha Rakhomo, Ha Raphoto (Ha Malephane), Ha Robi, Ha Sehloho (Lithabaneng), Ha Selebalo, Ha Sempe, Ha Soetsane, Ha Tafita, Ha Tamanyane, Lekhalong (Ha Leeto), Lekhalong (Ha Mangana), Letlapeng, Lichecheng (Ha Malephane), Likolobeng (Letlapeng), Likolobeng (Peling), Litseng (Ha Kabi), Makatseng (Phuthalichaba), Makatseng (Sekolong), Makatseng (Seqhobong), Maokeng, Mapeleng (Ha Malephane), Maphapheng, Matebeleng, Mokhoabong, Photha-Photha, Pontšeng, Sebapala, Sebapala (Aupolasi), Sebapala (Borokhong), Sebapala (Moreneng), Sekhutlong and Teraeng.

References

External links
 Google map of community villages

Populated places in Quthing District